Lestizza (locally ) is a comune (municipality) in the Province of Udine in the Italian region Friuli-Venezia Giulia, located about  northwest of Trieste and about  southwest of Udine.

Lestizza borders the following municipalities: Basiliano, Bertiolo, Codroipo, Mortegliano, Pozzuolo del Friuli, Talmassons.

References

External links
 Official website 

Cities and towns in Friuli-Venezia Giulia